Lamara  Chkonia (born December 27, 1930) is a Georgian soprano. Belonging to a circle of opera singers who made contributions to the vocal culture of Georgia and the former Soviet Union, Lamara was one of the few women to break through the Iron Curtain and present her talent to the world’s cultural community.

Early years
Lamara was born in Georgia, then part of the Soviet Union, to a theatrical and musical family. Her uncle Akaki Chkonia, a writer and a director of the Tbilisi Opera and Ballet Theatre, was executed in 1937 during the Great Purge.  At Tbilisi State Conservatoire, Lamara studied with Valerian Cashelli, who for years performed at Milan's La Scala and other Opera Houses in Italy. Under his tutelage, her art from the beginning was influenced by the Italian school of opera. After her tenure at home in Georgia's Tbilisi Opera, she was accepted as a leading soloist of the Kiev National Opera and Ballet Theatre. During the same time she debuted in productions of other famous theatres such as the Kirov Mariinsky Theatre in St. Petersburg.

As a singer, Lamara Chkonia has won numerous international and national competitions. Some of these include the Glinka Competition held in Moscow, the Sofia Competition held in Bulgaria, and the Prague Spring held in Czechoslovakia. She also won the Best Actress award at the Madame Butterfly Competition held in Japan. She was the very first female singer from the former Soviet state of Georgia to become a vocal competition's laureate.

Success and international recognition
Chkonia became a deputy of the Supreme Soviet of the USSR (1979–1984). The singer was invited to official state and private solo concerts, where among her listeners were Nikita Khrushchev, Leonid Brezhnev, Josip Broz Tito, Indira Gandhi, François Mitterrand, John F. Kennedy, Fidel Castro, Gustáv Husák, Yuri Gagarin, Todor Zhivkov, Erich Honecker, Nicolae Ceaușescu, János Kádár,  Mikhail Gorbachev, and Eduard Shevardnadze. She was a frequent guest on the state television shows such as Blue Light, Morning Post, Music Mail, and others. The name of Lamara Chkonia is included in the Great Soviet Encyclopedia. Her repertoire consists of about 40 opera parts, including Violetta, Madame Butterfly, Gilda, Marguerite, Rosina, and many others.

She made many recordings and recorded 15 CDs (over 250 works) for the "Golden Fund of the USSR" with the National Radio of Moscow, Tbilisi, and Kiev with the participation of the Soviet Union best symphony orchestras. The singer had numerous concert tours outside of the Soviet Union, where she received praise from critics.

In 1996, Lamara Chkonia moved permanently to Madrid to live with her youngest daughter, soprano Eteri Lamoris. There she engaged in teaching, leaving occasionally to conduct master classes in France and Portugal. Having 40-years of experience in teaching, Lamara Chkonia nurtured many singers (including her own daughters: Eteri Lamoris and Natela Nicoli).
In September 2011, the 80th Anniversary of Lamara Chkonia was celebrated at Batumi Music and Art Center.

Accolades 
In 1976, she was awarded People's Artist of the USSR, the highest artistic honour of the time. 

In 1984, the Higher Education Commission of the USSR awarded her the title of professor of the Higher Academy of Music.

Lamara Ckronia's State Awards include: 

 "Znak Pocheta" (Order of the Badge of Honor), USSR 1974
 «Кредо» (Credo), and "Орден Великомученицы Варвары" (order of St. Barbara) Ukraine 2011; 
 "Order of King Tamar” and The Presidential Order of Excellence", Republic of Georgia 2011
 Premio "Cigno D'Oro," Italy 2011

References

1930 births
Living people
People from Batumi
Mingrelian women
Tenth convocation members of the Soviet of Nationalities
20th-century women opera singers from Georgia (country)
Operatic sopranos from Georgia (country)
Soviet women singers